Rajesh Yadav is an Indian cinematographer who works in Tamil, Telugu, Kannada & Malayalam film industry. His film, Lee, Pokkisham were critically acclaimed for cinematography. He won Special Jury Award for Best cinematography (Pokkisham - Movie) in 7th Chennai International Film Festival.

Filmography

References

External links
 

Living people
Tamil film cinematographers
Kannada film cinematographers
Malayalam film cinematographers
Cinematographers from Tamil Nadu
1969 births